The 2020–21 season is Reyer Venezia's 150th in existence and the club's 12th consecutive season in the top tier Italian basketball.

Kit 
Supplier: Erreà / Sponsor: Umana

Players

Current roster

Depth chart

Squad changes

In

|}

Out

|}

Confirmed 

|}

Coach

On loan

Competitions

Supercup

Group stage

Playoffs

Serie A

EuroCup

Group A

References 

2021–22 in Italian basketball by club
2021–22 EuroCup Basketball by club